Belén López Peiró (born February 24, 1992 in Buenos Aires, Buenos Aires, Argentina) is an Argentine book writer and columnist. Signed to Libros Penguin, she is best known for her 2018 release, "Por Que Volvías Cada Verano?" ("Why Did You Return Every Summer?") in which she detailed the sexual abuse she allegedly survived.

López Peiró is also a columnist for El País, a Spaniard newspaper with a nationwide reach in her adopted country of Spain.

Early life 
López Peiró was born in 1992, the daughter of a journalist mother. By some accounts, she spent a mostly happy childhood, until the rapes and sexual molestation by her uncle-in-law allegedly started taking place after she turned 13.

López Peiró visited her aunt in the city of Santa Lucia, in Argentina, during summers. It was while there, that the rapes of her by her uncle in law, a policeman by the name of Claudio Sarlo, the city's sheriff, allegedly took place. According to López Peiró, this situation took place from the time she was 13, until she was 17.

Eventually, she became a student at the Universidad de Buenos Aires (UBA), from where she graduated with a degree in communication sciences. She also studied journalism at the Taller Escuela Agencia (TEA). At the UBA, she was a student of well-known writer Gabriela Cabezon Camara.

Career 
By 2014, López Peiró worked as an editor for a newspaper in Argentina, when she figured that many of the stories she came across as an editor reminded her of her own.

Her first book, "Por qué volvías cada verano?", was published by Spain's Editorial Las Afueras on November 16, 2020. That book was also published in Portuguese, Italian and French. Her second book, titled "Donde no Hago Pie" ("Where I Would Not Go To") was released on March 1, 2021, by Publicadora Lumen. Both books deal directly with the sexual abuse she was allegedly subjected to.

Uncle in law's trial 
During 2014, López Peiró accused sheriff Sarlo of rape. The case took eight years to be decided, but on December 19, 2022, it went to court. Five days later, on December 24, Sarlo was declared guilty. He was then sentenced to ten years in jail.

Books impact on women 
López Peiró's book "Porque Volvias Cada Verano?" and her activism inspired Brazilian actress Thelma Fardin and others, such as Gianella Neyra, to speak about their own abuse cases. In Fardin's case, she accused her countryman, actor Juan Darthes, of sexual abuse towards Fardin.

Personal life 
Belén López Peiró lives in Barcelona, Spain.

See also
List of Argentines

References 

1992 births
Living people
Argentine women writers
People from Buenos Aires
Sexual abuse victim advocates
University of Buenos Aires alumni
Argentine expatriates in Spain
People from Barcelona